In survey methodology, systematic sampling is a statistical method involving the selection of elements from an ordered sampling frame. The most common form of systematic sampling is an equiprobability method. 

In this approach, progression through the list is treated circularly, with a return to the top once the list ends. The sampling starts by selecting an element from the list at random and then every kth element in the frame is selected, where k, is the sampling interval (sometimes known as the skip): this is calculated as:

where n is the sample size, and N is the population size.

Using this procedure each element in the population has a known and equal probability of selection (also known as epsem). This makes systematic sampling functionally similar to simple random sampling (SRS). However, it is not the same as SRS because not every possible sample of a certain size has an equal chance of being chosen (e.g. samples with at least two elements adjacent to each other will never be chosen by systematic sampling). It is, however, much more efficient (if the variance within a systematic sample is more than the variance of the population).

Systematic sampling is to be applied only if the given population is logically homogeneous, because systematic sample units are uniformly distributed over the population. The researcher must ensure that the chosen sampling interval does not hide a pattern. Any pattern would threaten randomness.

Example: Suppose a supermarket wants to study buying habits of their customers, then using systematic sampling they can choose every 10th or 15th customer entering the supermarket and conduct the study on this sample.

This is random sampling with a system. From the sampling frame, a starting point is chosen at random, and choices thereafter are at regular intervals. For example, suppose you want to sample 8 houses from a street of 120 houses. 120/8=15, so every 15th house is chosen after a random starting point between 1 and 15. If the random starting point is 11, then the houses selected are 11, 26, 41, 56, 71, 86, 101, and 116.  As an aside, if every 15th house was a "corner house" then this corner pattern could destroy the randomness of the sample.

If, more frequently, the population is not evenly divisible (suppose you want to sample 8 houses out of 125, where 125/8=15.625), should you take every 15th house or every 16th house? If you take every 16th house, 8*16=128, there is a risk that the last house chosen does not exist. On the other hand, if you take every 15th house, 8*15=120, so the last five houses will never be selected. The random starting point should instead be selected as a non-integer between 0 and 15.625 (inclusive on one endpoint only) to ensure that every house has an equal chance of being selected; the interval should now be non-integral (15.625); and each non-integer selected should be rounded up to the next integer. If the random starting point is 3.6, then the houses selected are 4, 20, 35, 50, 66, 82, 98, and 113, where there are 3 cyclic intervals of 15 and 4 intervals of 16.

To illustrate the danger of systematic skip concealing a pattern, suppose we were to sample a planned neighborhood where each street has ten houses on each block. This places houses No. 1, 10, 11, 20, 21, 30... on block corners; corner blocks may be less valuable, since more of their area is taken up by street front etc. that is unavailable for building purposes. If we then sample every 10th household, our sample will either be made up only of corner houses (if we start at 1 or 10) or have no corner houses (any other start); either way, it will not be representative.

Systematic sampling may also be used with non-equal selection probabilities. In this case, rather than simply counting through elements of the population and selecting every kth unit, we allocate each element a space along a number line according to its selection probability. We then generate a random start from a uniform distribution between 0 and 1, and move along the number line in steps of 1.

Example: We have a population of 5 units (A to E). We want to give unit A a 20% probability of selection, unit B a 40% probability, and so on up to unit E (100%). Assuming we maintain alphabetical order, we allocate each unit to the following interval:
 A: 0 to 0.2
 B: 0.2 to 0.6 (= 0.2 + 0.4)
 C: 0.6 to 1.2 (= 0.6 + 0.6)
 D: 1.2 to 2.0 (= 1.2 + 0.8)
 E: 2.0 to 3.0 (= 2.0 + 1.0)

If our random start was 0.156, we would first select the unit whose interval contains this number (i.e. A). Next, we would select the interval containing 1.156 (element C), then 2.156 (element E). If instead our random start was 0.350, we would select from points 0.350 (B), 1.350 (D), and 2.350 (E).

See also 
 Low-discrepancy sequence

References

External links
TRSL – Template Range Sampling Library is a free-software and open-source C++ library that implements systematic sampling behind an (STL-like) iterator interface.

Sampling techniques